Metropolis Pt. 2: Scenes from a Memory is the fifth studio album and first concept album by American progressive metal band Dream Theater, released on October 26, 1999, through Elektra Records. It was recorded at BearTracks Studios in Suffern, New York, where the band had previously recorded their second studio album, Images and Words (1992), and the EP A Change of Seasons (1995).

The album is the sequel to "Metropolis—Part I: 'The Miracle and the Sleeper', a song featured on the band's 1992 album Images and Words. It was the first album to feature Jordan Rudess on keyboards.

For the album's twentieth anniversary, the band performed the album live in its entirety throughout the Distance over Time Tour (as documented on Distant Memories - Live in London).

History
Fans had previously requested a sequel to the song "Metropolis—Part I" from Images and Words, but the band had not yet been able—nor had they originally intended—to make one. The "Part I" was added by Petrucci as a joke. With the sessions for Falling Into Infinity (1997), the band recorded a 21-minute instrumental demo of "Metropolis Pt. 2" (which Mike Portnoy later released via his Ytsejam Records site along with the other Falling Into Infinity demos), but this did not make it onto that album. The demo, which included several musical citations from "Metropolis—Part I" and featured many motifs that would later appear on Metropolis Pt. 2: Scenes from a Memory (most notably the majority of "Overture 1928" and "Strange Deja Vu" and parts of "The Dance of Eternity" and "One Last Time"), was however significantly different from the finished album version in most parts.

After participating with keyboardist Jordan Rudess in Liquid Tension Experiment, a supergroup composed of various members of famous progressive rock bands, Mike Portnoy and John Petrucci found themselves writing music and working together with Rudess quite easily. They convinced the rest of the band to offer Rudess the position of full-time keyboardist for the band's upcoming album. He accepted, and current keyboardist Derek Sherinian was fired from the band via a conference call between the four members in New York and him in Los Angeles. (Portnoy and Petrucci have stated that while it was an uncomfortable and unattractive situation, they didn't want to ask Derek to fly from Los Angeles to New York only to be fired.)

After his departure, the band went back to BearTracks Studios in Suffern, New York, to record their new album, previously the site of recording for Images and Words (a photograph of Beartracks is featured on the album's back cover, meant to represent the house in the album). After the commercial failure of Falling Into Infinity, their record label gave the band free rein over their new album's direction, which led the band to finally finish the story. The final version of the story became a concept album, dealing with the story of a man named Nicholas and the discovery of his past life, which involves love, murder and infidelity as Victoria Page, and as such was heavily inspired by the 1991 film Dead Again, more so than "Metropolis—Part I".

Following the album's release, the band embarked on an extensive world tour, and at a show in New York City the band hired actors to perform the narrative elements of the album whilst they played. The performance was recorded and was released in 2001 as the Metropolis 2000 live DVD. In 2011 the album was released on LP for the first time to celebrate Record Store Day. In 2019, the twentieth anniversary of the release of Metropolis Pt. 2: Scenes from a Memory, Dream Theater performed it live in its entirety alongside material from their fourteenth studio album, Distance over Time. The Distance over Time tour was documented as well and released in November 2020.

Synopsis

Act I
Metropolis Pt. 2: Scenes from a Memory opens to Nicholas, a troubled man going through past life regression therapy. In a hypnotic trance induced by his hypnotherapist, he begins to see a girl named Victoria Page (her full name is in the CD booklet and was shown during the 2019 tour, when the album was performed in its entirety) and a life that feels strangely familiar, despite the fact that he has never been here. ("Regression") He learns that she was murdered, and that he was Victoria in a past life. ("Strange Deja Vu") He begins to believe that Victoria is haunting him to reveal the truth about her murder. ("Through My Words") Nicholas is able to recall that Victoria began distancing herself from her lover Julian Baynes (also given last name in 2019 tour video and is also in the CD insert) because of his drinking and gambling addictions; she sought comfort in Julian's brother Edward Baynes and began an affair with him. Nicholas assumes that Julian murdered her out of jealousy and then killed himself, a story backed up by a newspaper article covering the events, which cites a witness' testimony. However, Nicholas begins to doubt this series of events, and converses with an older man who was more familiar with the case (an animated video that played during "Fatal Tragedy" on the 2019 tour heavily suggests he is a reincarnated Julian). He realizes that he will never be able to get on with his own life until he solves her murder. ("Fatal Tragedy"; "Beyond This Life", "Through Her Eyes")

Act II
The second act begins by describing Julian's addictions to cocaine and gambling, which drives Victoria away from him. ("Home") Edward feels guilty about deceiving his brother, but decides that his love for Victoria is greater than his guilt, and he seduces her when she is vulnerable following her breakup. ("The Dance of Eternity") After visiting Edward's old house, Nicholas believes he has solved the mystery: Julian had tried to beg Victoria for forgiveness, and when rebuffed, killed both her and Edward, and positioned himself as the witness in the newspaper article. ("One Last Time") Nicholas comes to terms with what has happened, and bids farewell to Victoria. The hypnotherapist ends the session at this point, despite pleas from Victoria's memories. ("The Spirit Carries On") The narrative then cuts to Edward's perspective, revealing that he wished his romance with Victoria was more than a simple affair. As Victoria begins to reconcile with Julian again, Edward confronts the two of them, murders them, then stages the scene and assumes the role of the witness for the newspaper column. The flashback includes Edward telling Victoria to "open [her] eyes" before killing her, echoing the same words the hypnotherapist used to wake Nicholas from his hypnotic trance. ("Finally Free") In the present, Nicholas arrives home, followed by the hypnotherapist. Nicholas is startled by another request to "open [his] eyes", before the album cuts to (and concludes on) phonographic static. The band confirmed on the Scenes from New York live DVD that the hypnotherapist is Edward's reincarnation, and has killed Nicholas to complete the cycle yet again.

The static that closes this album continues at the beginning of "The Glass Prison", the first song on their next album, Six Degrees of Inner Turbulence (2002), and continuing a chain for their subsequent albums until Octavarium (2005) with the same idea but different closing notes.

Influences
Scenes from a Memory showcased a traditional progressive rock sound. According to the "Making of Scenes from a Memory" video, some of the influences for Metropolis Pt. 2 are the following concept albums: The Who's Tommy (1969), Genesis' The Lamb Lies Down on Broadway (1974), Roger Waters' Amused to Death (1992), Radiohead's OK Computer (1997), Queensrÿche's Operation: Mindcrime (1988), The Beatles' Sgt. Pepper's Lonely Hearts Club Band (1967), Marillion's Misplaced Childhood (1985), and Pink Floyds' The Wall (1979) and The Final Cut (1983). These albums are shown on a table Mike calls "Inspiration Corner".

Reception

Metropolis Pt. 2: Scenes from a Memory reached #73 on the Billboard 200 albums chart, #2 on the Billboard Top Internet Albums, #6 on the Finnish Albums Chart and #8 on the German Albums Chart. The album received acclaim from a variety of sources. It was ranked number 95 on the October 2006 issue of Guitar World magazine's list of "The greatest 100 guitar albums of all time". It is ranked as the 15th Greatest Concept Album (as of March 2003) by Classic Rock Magazine. The German Rock Hard magazine voted it Album of the Month, giving a perfect score, and eventually ranked it number 410 in their book The 500 Greatest Rock & Metal Albums of All Time in 2005.

In 2012, the readers of Rolling Stone voted the album into the #1 position of their "Your Favorite Prog Rock Albums of All Time" poll. Scenes from a Memory was ranked by the same magazine at #29 in their list "50 Greatest Prog Rock Albums of All Time."

In 2015, The Prog Report ranked it #3 in the Top 50 Modern Prog Albums 1990–2015.

Jordan Blum of PopMatters called the album "the greatest progressive metal work of all time."

Loudwire named it at #14 in their list "Top 25 Progressive Metal Albums of All Time."

Track listing

Chart performance

Personnel
Dream Theater
James LaBrie – lead vocals
John Petrucci – guitar, backing vocals, programming (track 7), production
Jordan Rudess – keyboard, choir arrangement and conducting (track 11)
John Myung – bass
Mike Portnoy – drums, background vocals, production

Guests
Theresa Thomason – additional vocals (tracks 7, 11), additional background vocals (track 11)
Mary Canty, Shelia Slappy, Mary Smith, Jeanette Smith, Clarence Burke Jr., Carol Cyrus, Dale Scott – additional background vocals (track 11)
Terry Brown – voice of the Hypnotherapist (uncredited)
David Bottrill – voice of Edward (uncredited)

Production
Doug Oberkircher – sound engineering
Brian Quackenbush – assistant engineering
Michael Bates – assistant engineering
Terry Brown – vocals co-production
Kevin Shirley – mixing engineering (tracks 2–8, 11)
Rory Romano – mixing engineering assistance (tracks 2–8, 11)
David Bottrill – mixing engineering (tracks 1, 9, 10, 12)
Shinobu Mitsuoka – mixing engineer assistance (tracks 1, 9, 10, 12)
George Marino – mastering engineering
Eugene Nastasi – mastering engineering assistance
Lili Picou – art direction and design
Dave McKean – cover illustration
Ken Schles – still life photography
Andrew Lepley – house photography
Darko Danicic – band photography

References

External links
Very detailed analysis of SFAM music and lyrics by Fabien Labonde

Dream Theater albums
1999 albums
Elektra Records albums
Concept albums
Rock operas
Albums with cover art by Dave McKean
Albums produced by Terry Brown (record producer)
Sequel albums